Antonovka is a rural locality (a selo) and the administrative center of Antonovsky Selsoviet of Zavitinsky District, Amur Oblast, Russia. The population was 447 as of 2018. There are 8 streets.

Geography 
Antonovka is located 32 km south of Zavitinsk (the district's administrative centre) by road. Raychikhinsk is the nearest rural locality.

References 

Rural localities in Zavitinsky District